Jilin  (alternately romanized as Kirin or Chilin) is one of the three provinces of Northeast China. Its capital and largest city is Changchun. Jilin borders North Korea (Rasŏn, North Hamgyong, Ryanggang and Chagang) and Russia (Primorsky Krai) to the east, Heilongjiang to the north, Liaoning to the south, and Inner Mongolia to the west. Along with the rest of Northeast China, Jilin underwent an early period of industrialization. However, Jilin's economy, characterized by heavy industry, has been facing economic difficulties with privatization. This prompted the central government to undertake a campaign called "Revitalize the Northeast". The region contains large deposits of oil shale.

Name

The name "Jilin" originates from girin ula  , a Manchu phrase meaning "along the river", shortened to Kirin in English. This Manchu term was transcribed into jilin wula (t , s ) in Chinese characters and  shortened the first two characters, which are transcribed in English as Chi-lin (Wade-Giles) and later "Jilin" (Hanyu Pinyin).

History 

In ancient times, Jilin was inhabited by the Xianbei, Sushen, the Mohe, Jurchens, and the Wùjí. The kingdoms of Buyeo and Goguryeo ruled parts of this area.

The region then fell successively under the domination of the Xiongnu, Xianbei state, Bohai Kingdom, Khitan Liao Dynasty, the Jurchen Jin Dynasty, and the Mongol Yuan dynasty.

After the Primorsky Krai area was ceded to Russia in 1860, the government began to open the area up to Han Chinese migrants, most of whom came from Shandong. By the beginning of the 20th century, Han Chinese had become the dominant ethnic group of the region. In 1932, the area was incorporated into Manchukuo, a puppet state set up by Japan. Changchun (then called Hsinking), capital of Jilin today, was made the capital of Manchukuo. After the defeat of Japan in 1945, the Red Army captured Jilin after Operation August Storm. The region, with the rest of northeastern China, was ceded to the Communists by the Soviet Union. Manchuria was the staging ground from which the communists eventually conquered the rest of China in the Chinese Civil War.

In 1949, Jilin province was smaller, encompassing only the environs of Changchun and Jilin City, and the capital was at Jilin City, while Changchun was a municipality independent from the province. In the 1950s, Jilin was expanded to its present borders. During the Cultural Revolution, Jilin was expanded again to include a part of Inner Mongolia, giving it a border with the independent state of Mongolia, though this was later reversed.

In recent times Jilin has, with the rest of heavy industry-based Northeast China, been facing economic difficulties with privatization. This prompted the central government to undertake a campaign called "Revitalize the Northeast".

Geography 
Jilin lies in the central part of northeastern China, bordering Russia and North Korea in the east and southeast respectively. Jilin is rich in natural mineral deposits with 136 types of minerals, of which 70 have been extracted. Jilin has an abundance of Traditional Chinese medicine resources, with approximately 27,000 kinds of wild plants and 9,000 kinds of medicinal herbs.

The province is rich in large reserves of oil, gas, coal, iron, nickel, molybdenum, talc, graphite, gypsum, cement rock, gold and silver; its reserves of oil shale are the largest in the country.

Jilin is highest in altitude in the southeast and drops gently towards the northwest. Other ranges include the Jilinhada Mountains, Zhang Guangcai Mountains, and Longgang Mountains.

Jilin is drained by the Yalu and Tumen rivers in the extreme southeast (which together form parts of the border between the People's Republic of China and North Korea), by tributaries of the Liao River in the southwest, and by the Songhua and Nen rivers in the north, both eventually flowing into the Amur.

Jilin has a northerly continental monsoon climate, with long, cold winters and short, warm summers.

Major cities in this province include Changchun, Jilin City, Baishan, Baicheng, Siping, Yanji, Songyuan, Tonghua and Liaoyuan.

Administrative divisions

Jilin consists of nine prefecture-level divisions: eight prefecture-level cities (including a sub-provincial city) and one autonomous prefecture:

These nine prefecture-level divisions are in turn subdivided into 60 county-level divisions (21 districts, 20 county-level cities, 16 counties, and three autonomous counties). (See List of administrative divisions of Jilin.) These administrative divisions are explained in greater detail at Administrative divisions of the People's Republic of China. At the end of the year 2017, the total population is 27.17 million.

Urban areas

Politics

The politics of Jilin is structured in a dual party-government system like all other governing institutions in mainland China.

The Governor of Jilin is the highest-ranking official in the People's Government of Jilin. However, in the province's dual party-government governing system, the Governor has less power than the Jilin Communist Party of China Provincial Committee Secretary, colloquially termed the "Jilin CPC Party Chief".

Economy 
In 2011, the nominal GDP of Jilin province totaled RMB 1053.1 billion (US$167.1 billion). Its GDP has been rising at a double-digit rate since 2003, growing 51 percent from 2003 to 2007. Per capita nominal GDP increased to RMB 26,289 (US$3,848) in 2009. Meanwhile, the incremental value and profit of large enterprises witnessed an increase of 19 percent and 30 percent respectively, compared with 2005 figures.

Jilin's agricultural production is centered upon rice, wheat, maize, and sorghum. Rice is mostly cultivated in the eastern parts, such as Yanbian Prefecture. The Changbai Mountains are an important source of lumber. Sheep herding is an important activity in the western parts, such as Baicheng.

Among its natural resources, Jilin has the largest reserves of shale oil and one of the top five largest mineral reserves in China. Compared to other provinces of China, Jilin has extensive deposits of Kieselguhr, wollastonite, floatstone, and molybdenum.

Industry in Jilin is concentrated on automobiles, train carriages, and iron alloy.

Jilin is one of the most important commodity grain bases in China. It is ranked 6th in timber production.

Traditionally, Jilin has been known as a major pharmaceutical center, with yields of ginseng and deer antlers among the largest in China, being used extensively in  the field of Chinese medicine.

Economic and technological development zones

Jilin New and Hi-tech Industry Development Zone
The zone was founded in 1992 and is in Jilin city, covering  of planned area with  established. The leading industries in the zone are new materials, refined chemical products, integration of photoelectron and mechanism, electronics, medicine and bioengineering. A mere  from Songhua Lake, the nearest bus and train stations are within .

The Jilin Economic and Technological Development Zone was founded in May 1998 and is in the northeast of Jilin city.

Ji lin is a very good sided hotel.It would have been Major industries.
Major industries include refined chemicals, bioengineering, fine processing of chemical fiber, and farm products. It is divided into four parts: the Chemical Industrial Park, the Food Industrial Park, the Textile Industrial Park, and the Medical Industrial Park. The latter specializes in the development of traditional Chinese pharmaceuticals, mini molecule medicine, bio-pharmaceuticals and health products.

State-level ETDZs Changchun Economic and Technological Development Zone
In 1993, with the approval of the state, Changchun Economic & Technological Development Zone (CETDZ) became a state-level economic and technological development zone. By the end of 2006, the total fixed assets investment of the Changchun Economic and Technological Development Zone reached 38.4 billion yuan. There were 1656 registered enterprises in this zone including 179 foreign-funded enterprises. The regional gross product of the zone reached 101.8 billion yuan; industrial output value reached 233.0 billion Yuan; overall financial revenue reached 15.7 billion yuan.

Changchun is also the location of one of the largest factories where CRRC manufactures bullet trains. In November 2016, CRCC Changchun unveiled the first bullet train carriages in the world that would have sleeper berths, and would be capable of running in ultra low temperature environments. Nicknamed Panda, they are capable of running at 250 kmph, operate at -40 degrees Celsius, have Wi-Fi hubs and contain sleeper berths that fold into seats during the day.

State-level HIDZs Changchun High-Tech Industrial Development Area
Changchun High-Tech Industrial Development Area is connected by four roads and one light-rail line to the downtown area. The nearest train station, Changchun Station, is twenty minutes away by light rail. In 2002, Changchun HDA became the first area in Northeast China to qualify for the environmental certification of ISO14001. Its landscaping ratio reaches 38%.

Hunchun Border Economic Cooperation Zone
In 2002 and 2001, the Huichun Export Processing Zone and Huichun Sino-Russia Trade Zone were set up in it. It has a strategic location at the junction of the borders of China, Russia and Korea. It focuses on the development of sea food processing, electronic product manufacture, bio-pharmaceuticals, textile industry and other industries.

Hunchun Export Processing Zone
The Hunchun Export Processing Zone is in  area is in the Hunchun Border Economic Cooperation Zone. It relies on the same infrastructure and policies as its parent zone.

Infrastructure 

The province has an excellent rail network, begun by the Japanese, with Changchun as its main hub. There are four major new railway projects which started construction in 2007. One of these, the Harbin–Dalian High-Speed Railway connecting Harbin with Dalian via Changchun was completed in 2012. The four railway projects were estimated to cost RMB13 billion, and the province urged foreign investors to invest in them. A line from Changchun to Jilin City, expected to be completed in 2015, was expected to cut the journey times between the cities from 96 minutes to 30. The railway network in Jilin can be divided into two directions in the northwest–southeast and southwest–northeast. The main trunk line Beijing-Harbin railway runs through the north and south of Jilin. From Jilin Province, it can go directly to Harbin, Shenyang, Dalian, Beijing, Tianjin, Xi'an, Shijiazhuang, Wuhan, Jinan, and so on. By the end of 2015, the railway business mileage of Jilin province reached .

The main commercial airport is Changchun Longjia International Airport; other commercial airports include Yanji Chaoyangchuan International Airport, Tonghua Sanyuanpu Airport, Baicheng Chang'an Airport, Songyuan Chaganhu Airport and Changbaishan Airport.

Jilin is landlocked. River navigation is possible from April to November. The major river ports are at Da'an, Jilin city and Fuyu. In 2007, Jilin started construction on a two-phase RMB60 million comprehensive river port; the first phase is finished. The port is on the Songhua River, has an annual throughput of two million tons, and will connect to the waterways of Northeast China. Aviation takes Changchun as the center, supplemented by Yanji and Baishan. It can go directly to Beijing, Shanghai, Guangzhou, Haikou, Ningbo, Dalian, Kunming, Hong Kong, South Korea, Japan and so on. Changchun Longjia Airport, Yanji Airport, Tonghua Sanyuanpu Airport and Changbaishan Airport, etc.

Demographics 

Jilin is inhabited by Han Chinese, Manchus, Hui, Mongols and Xibe. Most ethnic Koreans live in the Yanbian Korean Autonomous Prefecture. The Manchu people were once the majority in the area of Jilin, making it part of their historical region. With the adoption of Han culture and the Chinese languages by the Manchu people, the Manchu language is considered a critically endangered language. Koreans comprise about 4% of the population, owing to its proximity to the Korean Peninsula. The majority of the province speaks Mandarin.

Excludes members of the People's Liberation Army in active service.

Culture
Jilin is part of Northeast China and shares many similarities in culture to neighbouring regions, such as Errenzhuan and Yangge. Among its music, Jiju, or Jilin Opera, is a form of traditional entertainment that Jilin has innovated over its short migrant history.

The ethnic Koreans of Jilin have a distinct culture, closely tied to Korea.

Languages

The majority of the province speaks Mandarin, the official language of China. Closer to the east, many people speak Korean. Some people of Qian Gorlos autonomous county speak Mongolian.

Cuisine

Tourism 
The Goguryeo sites and tombs found in Ji'an, Jilin, including Hwando Mountain City, Gungnae City, and the pyramidal Tomb of the General, have been listed as part of the Capital Cities and Tombs of the Ancient Koguryo Kingdom, a World Heritage Site.

Paektu Mountain, especially Heaven Lake on the border with North Korea, are popular tourist destinations due to their natural scenery.

Ancient Tombs at Longtou Mountain, including the Mausoleum of Princess Jeonghyo, are royal tombs of Balhae found in Yanbian Korean Autonomous Prefecture.

Education

Universities and colleges 

 Jilin University
 Jilin Medical College
 Northeast Normal University
 Jilin Agricultural University
 Jilin Normal University
 Changchun University of Science and Technology
 Changchun University of Technology
 Changchun Normal University
 Changchun University
 Changchun Taxation College
 Yanbian University of Science and Technology
 Yanbian University
 Northeast China Institute of Electric Power Engineering
 Jilin College of Electrification
 Changchun Institute of Post & Telecommunications
 Changchun Institute of Optics and Fine Mechanics
 Beihua University
 Jilin Agricultural Science and Technology University
 Changchun Institute of Technology

Sports

Professional teams
 Chinese Basketball Association
 Jilin Northeast Tigers
 Chinese Football Association League
 Changchun Yatai
 Yanbian FC

Notable individuals 
 O Kuk-ryol, Chinese-born North Korean general and politician
 Choe Hyon, Chinese-born North Korean general and politician
 Ri Tu-ik, Chinese-born North Korean vice-marshal and politician
 Li Hongbo, sculptor
 Guo Junchen, actor
 Wei Daxun, actor
 Huang Renjun, main vocalist and lead dancer of K-pop boyband NCT and NCT Dream

See also

 List of Major National Historical and Cultural Sites in Jilin

References

External links 

 Jilin Government website 
 Jilin Administration of Industry and Commerce 
 Development zones and ports 
 Economic profile for Jilin at HKTDC

 
Manchuria
Provinces of the People's Republic of China